Feuerschützenbostel is a hamlet in the town of Bergen in North Germany that belongs to the parish of Eversen. It lies 2.5 km west of Eversen and currently has 23 inhabitants.

Sources 
Franz Rathmann: Dorfbuch Eversen. Ein Haus- und Lesebuch, 1998.

External links 
Website of Rittergut Feuerschützenbostel

Celle (district)
Villages in Lower Saxony
Bergen, Lower Saxony